Lardaro (Lardèr in local dialect) was a comune (municipality) in Trentino in the northern Italian region Trentino-Alto Adige/Südtirol, located about  southwest of Trento.  It was merged with Bondo, Breguzzo and Roncone on January 1, 2016, to form a new municipality, Sella Giudicarie.
 

 
Cities and towns in Trentino-Alto Adige/Südtirol